Yakubu Gowon Stadium (formerly Liberation Stadium) is a multi-purpose stadium in the Elekahia suburb of Port Harcourt, Nigeria. It is currently used mostly for football matches and is the home stadium of Rivers United F.C., formerly Dolphins F.C. The stadium has a capacity of 16,000

In 2015, it was renamed in honor of former military head of state, General Yakubu Gowon.

Events

1999 FIFA World Youth Championship

References 

Football venues in Nigeria
Multi-purpose stadiums in Nigeria
Sports venues in Port Harcourt
2001 establishments in Nigeria
2000s establishments in Rivers State